In mathematics, a partition of an interval  on the real line is a finite sequence  of real numbers such that

.

Every interval of the form  is referred to as a subinterval of the partition x.

Refinement of a partition

Norm of a partition
The norm (or mesh) of the partition
 

is the length of the longest of these subintervals
 {{math|maxxi − xi−1}} : i  1, … , n .

Applications
Partitions are used in the theory of the Riemann integral, the Riemann–Stieltjes integral and the regulated integral. Specifically, as finer partitions of a given interval are considered, their mesh approaches zero and the Riemann sum based on a given partition approaches the Riemann integral.

Tagged partitions
A tagged partition is a partition of a given interval together with a finite sequence of numbers  subject to the conditions that for each ,
 .

In other words, a tagged partition is a partition together with a distinguished point of every subinterval: its mesh is defined in the same way as for an ordinary partition. It is possible to define a partial order on the set of all tagged partitions by saying that one tagged partition is bigger than another if the bigger one is a refinement of the smaller one.

Said more simply, a refinement of a tagged partition takes the starting partition and adds more tags, but does not take any away.

See also
 Regulated integral
 Riemann integral
 Riemann–Stieltjes integral
 Partition of a set

References

Further reading
 

Mathematical analysis